James Pattison Cockburn (18 March 1779 – 18 March 1847) was an artist, author and military officer. He was born into a military family and received his military training at the Royal Military Academy, Woolwich where he received training in drawing which was related to the skills required for topography.

Life
Cockburn had a long  military career  and retired with the rank of Major-General. Throughout his time in the army, which took him to many parts of the world, he sketched and produced a steady flow of travel books which he illustrated himself. They include A Voyage to Cadiz and Gibraltar, with 30 coloured plates, published in 1815; Swiss Scenery, with 62 plates, in 1820; The Route of the Simplon, in 1822; The Valley of Aosta, in 1823 and Pompeii Illustrated, in folio, in 1827.

Cockburn spent two periods in Canada during his military career. The first, from November 1822 to June 1823, produced little work that has survived, but his second posting, lasting from April 1826 to August 1832, proved artistically productive. Many works from this "mature" period cover subjects from both Upper Canada and Lower Canada with Niagara Falls producing some of the finest work.

Cockburn finished his career as the director of the laboratory of the Royal Arsenal at Woolwich where he died. His body of work is large and has yet to be reconstructed in a comprehensive manner for more in-depth study.

Notes

References
 
 

Attribution:

External links
 
 

1779 births
1847 deaths
19th-century British painters
British male painters
British travel writers
Royal Artillery officers
British Army major generals
People from Woolwich
Place of birth missing
19th-century British male artists